Hubert Garschall (born 29 December 1939) is an Austrian former sports shooter. He competed at the 1968, 1972 and 1976 Summer Olympics.

References

External links
 

1939 births
Living people
Austrian male sport shooters
Olympic shooters of Austria
Shooters at the 1968 Summer Olympics
Shooters at the 1972 Summer Olympics
Shooters at the 1976 Summer Olympics
20th-century Austrian people